opened on the shore of  in Mito, Ibaraki Prefecture, Japan, in October 1988. The collection, numbering some 3,700 pieces as of October 2015, includes works by Manet, Monet, and Renoir, Gustave Courbet, Eugène Carrière, Camille Pissarro und Alfred Sisley as well as Yōga and Nihonga by artists including Tsuguharu Foujita, Heihachirō Fukuda, Taikan Yokoyama, Yukihiko Yasuda, Tetsugoro Yorozu, Kanzan Shimomura, Kenzo Okada, Yasuo Kuniyoshi, Kiyokata Kaburagi, Kokei Kobayashi, Gyoshū Hayami, Hishida Shunsō, and Shikō Imamura.

Noteworthy works in the collection include Chrysanthèmes by Édouard Manet, Grotte de Port-Domois by Claude Monet and Portrait de Mademoiselle Francois by Pierre-Auguste Renoir.

See also
 Ibaraki Prefectural Museum of History
 List of Cultural Properties of Japan - paintings (Ibaraki)

References

External links

  The Museum of Modern Art, Ibaraki
  Collection Database

Museums in Ibaraki Prefecture
Mito, Ibaraki
Art museums and galleries in Japan
Prefectural museums
Art museums established in 1988
1988 establishments in Japan